Gavin Peter McCann (born 10 January 1978) is an English retired footballer who played as a midfielder in the English Premier League. He has one England cap to his name, playing against Spain at Villa Park in 2001. He is currently the First Team coach at Hyde United.

Club career
McCann played junior football for Y.M.C.A juniors in Lytham St Annes. He signed for Everton where he was a product of their academy. In 1998, he moved to Sunderland where he was a member of the side which won the Division One title and promotion to the Premiership with 105 points in 1999.

He signed for Aston Villa in 2003, where he had numerous injury setbacks. He scored one goal in the 2006–07 season in a 3–1 home loss to Manchester City. He was no longer guaranteed first team football, so decided to leave Villa Park, and in June 2007, he signed a five-year contract with Bolton Wanderers.

McCann scored his first goal for Bolton in their 1–0 UEFA Cup group win over Red Star Belgrade in December 2007 and followed this up with a goal in a 1–1 draw with Sporting Clube de Portugal at the Reebok Stadium three months later in the knockout stage of the cup. He scored his first league goal for Bolton in a 1–0 victory over Middlesbrough at the Riverside Stadium on 19 April 2008.

In November 2008 he received high acclaim from the Bolton manager Gary Megson who stated that the midfielder was playing some of the best football of his career since moving to the Reebok Stadium.

McCann's contract ran out at the end of June 2010, McCann had picked up a knee injury and Owen Coyle said that once he recovered from the injury, he would have a chance to earn a new contract.

In early 2011, teammate Kevin Davies confirmed on the social networking site Twitter that McCann had retired from the game having failed to overcome injury. McCann remained active at Bolton in the backroom at youth level until he left to join Hyde's management team in early 2015, and studied for his professional coaching badges.
McCann also worked for Wrea Green FC on a Sunday morning whilst also playing in a soccer sixes league back where he started at Lytham YMCA.

In late 2015, he was back at Bolton, coaching their U15 team. In 2018, he was promoted to coaching Bolton's U18 team. He left Bolton on January 29, 2021.

International career
McCann has played once for the England national team, in a friendly against Spain at Villa Park in 2001.

Managing
In February 2008, McCann launched his own football academy in Lytham St Annes, the first one on the Fylde coast. The Milligan-McCann Academy is aimed at 8- to 12-year-olds and runs at King Edward VII and Queen Mary School. McCann teamed up with former Blackpool players, Jamie Milligan, who has been at Fleetwood Town since 2004 and John Hills who also signed for Fleetwood Town in August 2008, both of whom were born in Blackpool and grew up with McCann, to create the academy. In October 2008 the academy landed a major sponsorship deal with Northern Care, with coaching sessions continuing at King Edward VII & Queen Mary School each weekend as well as week-long summer courses. The academy has also received a grant to encourage children to play "park football".

In May 2012, he was appointed as Assistant Manager and first team coach at Hyde, alongside manager Scott McNiven.

After six years back at Bolton working with the Academy sides, he returned to Hyde United as the first team coach in February 2022, reuniting once again with his former Wanderers colleague Nicky Spooner.

Personal life
McCann lives in Lytham St Annes with his wife and children.

Career statistics

Club
Source:

References

External links

English footballers
England international footballers
Association football midfielders
Everton F.C. players
Sunderland A.F.C. players
Aston Villa F.C. players
Bolton Wanderers F.C. players
Bolton Wanderers F.C. non-playing staff
Blackpool F.C. non-playing staff
Premier League players
Sportspeople from Blackpool
1978 births
Living people
Sportspeople from Lancashire